São Bento River may refer to:

 São Bento River (Goiás), Brazil
 São Bento River (Mãe Luzia River), Brazil
 São Bento River (Rio do Peixe), Brazil